Hirvo Surva (born 2 July 1963 in Kohtla-Järve) is an Estonian choir conductor and politician. He was a member of X Riigikogu.

References

Living people
1963 births
Estonian conductors (music)
Estonian choral conductors
Res Publica Party politicians
Members of the Riigikogu, 2003–2007
People from Kohtla-Järve
Estonian Academy of Music and Theatre alumni